The Ministry of Veterans Affairs is a ministry of the State Council which is responsible for military veterans in the country. It was formed on 19 March 2018. Some of its responsibilities come from Ministry of Civil Affairs, Ministry of Human Resources and Social Security, Political Work Department of the Central Military Commission and Logistic Support Department of the Central Military Commission.

History 
On March 19, 2018, the Government of the People's Republic of China announced that the Ministry of Veterans Affairs has been created at the first session of the 13th National People's Congress. That same day, Sun Shaocheng was elected Minister of Veterans Affairs.

List of ministers

References 

2018 establishments in China
Veterans
Ministries established in 2018
Veterans' affairs in China
China